Thanh Tri may refer to several places in Vietnam:

Thanh Trì
Thanh Trì District, a rural district of Hanoi
Thanh Trì (ward), a ward of Hoàng Mai District, Hanoi
Thanh Trì Bridge

Thạnh Trị
Thạnh Trị District, a rural district of Sóc Trăng Province